Bohssas, Behsas,  is a Maronite village in Koura District of Lebanon.

References

Maronite Christian communities in Lebanon
Populated places in the North Governorate
Koura District